Fyrstekake or prince's cake is a Norwegian cake consisting of shortcrust pastry, almond filling or marzipan, rum, powdered sugar, butter, cardamom, cinnamon, and eggs. It typically has a signature lattice pattern on top and a decadent, moist filling. It is occasionally topped with whipped cream and served during Christmas, along with coffee or tea.

History 
Fyrstekake was developed by a confectioner in Trondheim in 1856 and has been a staple in Norwegian bakeries every since.

See also 
 List of Norwegian desserts
 Norwegian cuisine

References 

Norwegian cuisine
Cakes